Tazehabad-e Bostan Kheyl (also Romanized as Tāzehābād-e Bostān Kheyl; also known as Tāzehābād) is a village in Qareh Toghan Rural District, in the Central District of Neka County, Mazandaran Province, Iran. At the 2006 census, its population was 357, in 81 families.

References 

Populated places in Neka County